Inter Club Brazzaville, commonly known as Inter Club, is a Congolese basketball club based in Brazzaville. The team is most known as being the first club of NBA player Serge Ibaka.

Honours
FIBA Africa Basketball League
Third place: 2002
Fourth place: 2006

In African competitions
FIBA Africa Clubs Champions Cup  (6 appearances)
2002 –  3rd place
2005 – 7th place
2006 – 4th place
2009 – 7th place
2010 – 8th place
2015 – 9th place

Players

Notable players

 Bertrand Boukinda
 Japhie Nguia
 Max Kouguere 
 Serge Ibaka

References

External links
InterClub Brazzaville at Afrobasket.com
Basketball teams in the Republic of the Congo
Basketball teams established in 1967